Eublemmoides apicimacula, also known as the chocolate tip eublemma, is a moth of the family Noctuidae. It is found in Africa south of the Sahara, Senegal, Mauritania, São Tomé and Principe, Kenia, South Africa, the Indian Ocean islands and in Yemen.

References

Noctuidae
Moths described in 1880
Moths of Cape Verde
Moths of the Comoros
Moths of Africa
Moths of Madagascar
Moths of Mauritius
Moths of Réunion
Moths of Seychelles
Moths of the Middle East